Brent Central is a constituency represented in the House of Commons of the UK Parliament. It is currently represented, since 2015, by Dawn Butler of the Labour Party.

History
The seat was created in the London review of seats of the Boundary Commission before the 2010 general election from parts of predecessors Brent East, Brent South and Brent North – the first two of which no longer exist.

Sarah Teather was the constituency's first MP until 2015, when she stood down; she had previously represented the old Brent East constituency since a 2003 by-election. Dawn Butler, previously Labour MP for Brent South lost to Teather in 2010 and gained the seat in 2015 with a majority of over 40% over the Conservative candidate, whilst the Liberal Democrat share of the vote fell by 35.8%, the sharpest fall in the party's vote share in that election.

Constituency profile
The Brent Central constituency forms the central portion of the London Borough of Brent.  Since the early 1990s the Conservative party has had a small minority of councillors but been without wards in the constituency; a plurality of the voters in each ward have been in favour of the Labour Party and/or the Liberal Democrats.  It is mostly in the postal district of NW10, but also partly falls under NW2, NW9 and HA9.

Districts and ethnicity
Kensal Green lies at the southeast of the constituency, neighbouring Stonebridge and Harlesden, which have a high concentration of Black residents and severe deprivation. The southwest corner is dominated by the Park Royal industrial estate, the largest in Europe. To the west is the 21st century-built Wembley Stadium; the north takes in Dollis Hill including part of the Welsh Harp Reservoir. Other than Harlesden and Stonebridge, pockets prominent in the Index of Multiple Deprivation are in smallest areas (Output Areas of censuses) within Willesden Green and Neasden, which has Britain's largest Hindu temple. Although there is a mixed income established Asian minority, the proportion of the borough's residents who describe themselves as being of Asian ethnicity is the fourth-highest in London, the highest proportion of Asian backgrounds being the London Borough of Newham.  The proportion of social housing and rented housing is close to the average of Greater London; this increased by 66% in the ten years to 2011 to 30%.

Boundaries

Brent Central is made up of nine electoral wards from the London Borough of Brent:

Dollis Hill, Dudden Hill, Harlesden, Kensal Green, Mapesbury, Stonebridge, Tokyngton, Welsh Harp, Willesden Green

Boundary review
Following its review of parliamentary representation in North London, the Boundary Commission for England reduced Brent and Camden's constituencies from five to four. To create the new Brent Central constituency, Dollis Hill ward, Dudden Hill ward, Mapesbury ward, and parts of Welsh Harp ward, Willesden Green ward, Kensal Green ward, and Stonebridge ward were taken from the former Brent East constituency; Harlesden ward, and parts of Stonebridge ward, Willesden Green ward, Kensal Green ward, Tokyngton ward, and Welsh Harp ward were taken from the former Brent South constituency; and part of Welsh Harp ward was taken from the reconstituted Brent North constituency.

Members of Parliament

Elections

Elections in the 2010s

 
 
 

* Served as MP for Brent East in the 2005–2010 Parliament
** Served as MP for Brent South in the 2005–2010 Parliament

See also
 List of parliamentary constituencies in London
 Opinion polling for the next United Kingdom general election in individual constituencies

References

External links
nomis Constituency Profile for Brent Central — presenting data from the ONS annual population survey and other official statistics.
Politics Resources (Election results from 1922 onwards)
Electoral Calculus (Election results from 1955 onwards)

Parliamentary constituencies in London
Politics of the London Borough of Brent
Constituencies of the Parliament of the United Kingdom established in 2010